The Republicans held a presidential primary election, officially called the open primary of the right and centre, to select a candidate for the 2017 presidential election. It took place on 20 November 2016, with a runoff on 27 November since no candidate obtained at least 50% of the vote in the first round. It was the first time an open primary had been held for The Republicans or its predecessor parties.

In the first round of The Republicans primary on 20 November, François Fillon won an upset victory with 44% of the vote, while Alain Juppé—long held by most opinion polls as the favourite to win the nomination—came in a distant second with 29%. Former President Nicolas Sarkozy, who was projected to come in second behind Juppé, was eliminated with just under 21% of the vote.

In the runoff round, Fillon won by an even larger margin with nearly twice as many votes as Juppé (66.5% to 33.5%). Of the six departments and similar areas won by Sarkozy in the first round, all switched to Fillon in the runoff. Similarly, of the thirteen departments and similar areas that originally voted for Juppé, eight switched to Fillon in the second round. The constituency for French residents overseas was won by Juppé in the first round and Fillon in the second round.

Voting procedures
Unlike previous Union for a Popular Movement primaries, this was the first primary to be open to the general public. The first round of voting took place on 20 November 2016. Voting booths were open from 7 a.m. to 8 p.m. A runoff was held on 27 November after no candidate obtained at least 50% of the vote in the first round.

All registered voters were allowed to vote in the primary, as well as minors whose eighteenth birthday was before 23 April 2017. 10,228 voting booths were established with each person on the voting register attached to an office. To receive a ballot, a voter must pay 2 euros.

People abroad who wanted to vote in The Republicans party were given electronic voting machines to do so.

Candidates
Candidates from The Republicans had to obtain the support of 20 members of the National Assembly, 2,500 party members and 250 elected representatives to participate. For candidates from other parties, the party themselves would decide the conditions for their submission into the primary. Seven candidates were accepted by the High Authority on September 6, 2016:

Validated candidates

Withdrawn candidates
 Xavier Bertrand, President of the Regional Council of Hauts-de-France since 2016, former Mayor of Saint-Quentin from 2010-2016; former Minister of Labour, Employment and Health from 2010–2012; former Secretary-General of the UMP from 2008–2010
 Christian Estrosi, President of the Regional Council of Provence-Alpes-Côte d'Azur since 2015; Mayor of Nice since 2008; former Deputy Minister of Industry from 2009–2010; former Deputy Minister of Overseas France from 2007–2008; former Deputy Minister of Planning of the Territory from 2005–2007

Opinion polls

First round

Second round

Polls conducted prior to the first round

Polls conducted after the first round

Hypothetical Polling

Juppé-Sarkozy

Juppé-Le Maire

Sarkozy-Le Maire

Sarkozy-Fillon

Le Maire-Fillon

Results
In the first round of the primary on November 20, Fillon won an upset victory with 44% of the vote, while Juppé - long held by most opinion polls as the favorite to win the nomination - came in a distant second with 29%. Sarkozy, who was projected to come in second behind Juppé, was eliminated with just under 21% of the vote. In his concession speech, Sarkozy endorsed Fillon and vowed to "embark on a life with more private passions and fewer public passions." This led to some media outlets declaring that "Sarkozy's political career [had] been effectively ended."

In the runoff round, Fillon won by an even larger margin with nearly twice as many votes as Juppé (66.5% to 33.5%). Of the five departments won by Sarkozy in the first round, all but one switched to Fillon in the runoff. Similarly, of the thirteen departments that originally voted for Juppé, nine switched to Fillon in the second round.

|- style="background-color:#E9E9E9;text-align:center;"
! rowspan="2" colspan="2" style="text-align:left" | Candidates
! rowspan="2" colspan="2" style="text-align:left" | Parties
! colspan="2" | 1st round
! colspan="2" | 2nd round
|- style="background-color:#E9E9E9;text-align:center;"
! width="60" | Votes
! width="30" | %
! width="60" | Votes
! width="30" | %
|- style="font-weight:bold"
| style="background-color:" |
| style="text-align:left;" | François Fillon
| style="text-align:left;" | The Republicans
| LR
| 
| %
| 
| %
|-
| style="background-color:" |
| style="text-align:left;" | Alain Juppé
| style="text-align:left;" | The Republicans
| LR
| 
| %
| 
| %
|-
| style="background-color:" |
| style="text-align:left;" | Nicolas Sarkozy
| style="text-align:left;" | The Republicans
| LR
| 
| %
| colspan="2" rowspan="5" style="background-color:#E9E9E9" | 
|-
| style="background-color:" |
| style="text-align:left;" | Nathalie Kosciusko-Morizet
| style="text-align:left;" | The Republicans
| LR
| 
| %
|-
| style="background-color:" |
| style="text-align:left;" | Bruno Le Maire
| style="text-align:left;" | The Republicans
| LR
| 
| %
|-
| style="background-color:" |
| style="text-align:left;" | Jean-Frédéric Poisson
| style="text-align:left;" | Christian Democratic Party
| PCD
| 
| %
|-
| style="background-color:" |
| style="text-align:left;" | Jean-François Copé
| style="text-align:left;" | The Republicans
| LR
| 
| %
|-
| colspan="8" style="background-color:#E9E9E9" |
|- style="font-weight:bold;"
| colspan="4" style="text-align:left" | Total
| 
| 100%
| 
| 100%
|-
| colspan="8" style="background-color:#E9E9E9" |
|-
| colspan="4" style="text-align:left" | Valid votes
| 
| %
| 
| %
|-
| colspan="4" style="text-align:left" | Spoilt and null votes
| 
| %
| 
| %
|- style="font-weight:bold;"
| colspan="4" style="text-align:left" | Total
| 
| 100%
| 
| 100%
|-
| colspan="8" style="background-color:#E9E9E9" |
|-
| colspan="8" style="text-align:left" | Table of results ordered by number of votes received in first round. Official results by High Authority.

Source: First round result  Second round result
|}

See also 
Socialist Party (France) presidential primary, 2017

References

External links
Official website and results

Republicans
November 2016 events in France
Republicans, 2016
Presidential primary, 2016
2017 French presidential election